The anime series Tōhai Densetsu Akagi: Yami ni Maiorita Tensai is based on the manga series Akagi: Yami ni Oritatta Tensai written and illustrated by Nobuyuki Fukumoto. The series is directed by Yūzō Satō and co-produced by Nippon Television (NTV), VAP, Forecast and Madhouse. It follows Akagi, a mahjong player who becomes a legend after defeating well versed opponents while still 13-year-old only to return six years later.

The series was originally broadcast between October 5, 2005 and March 29, 2006 on NTV. The 26 episodes were later combined into two DVD box sets, released by VAP on March 24, and May 24, 2006. Streaming service Crunchyroll licensed the anime for an English-language release from September 10, 2013.

The series has three pieces of theme music: a single opening theme and two ending themes. The first ending theme from episodes one to thirteen is "Akagi" by Maximum the Hormone and the second theme for the remaining episodes is "S.T.S." by Animals.

Episode list

References

External links
 
 

Akagi